Cyrus Warren Strickler, Sr. (November 12, 1872 – July 23, 1953) served in World War II for three and a half years. He was a professor of clinical medicine at Emory University.

1872 births
1953 deaths
Emory University faculty